Beacon View is an unincorporated area and census-designated place (CDP) in Sarpy County, Nebraska, United States. It is in the southwest part of the county, on the east bank of the Platte River. It is bordered to the south, across U.S. Route 6, by the CDP of Linoma Beach. US-6 leads northeast  to Gretna and southwest  to Nebraska.

The community was first listed as a CDP prior to the 2020 census.

Demographics

References 

Census-designated places in Sarpy County, Nebraska
Census-designated places in Nebraska